"Let It Snow! Let It Snow! Let It Snow!" is a popular Christmas song.

Let It Snow may also refer to:

Film
 Let It Snow (2001 film), an American romantic comedy film
 Let It Snow (2019 film), an American romantic comedy based on the 2008 novel (see below)
  Let It Snow (2020 film), a Ukrainian-Georgian horror film
 Love the Coopers (working title Let It Snow), a 2015 American comedy-drama film

Literature
 Let It Snow: Three Holiday Romances, a 2008 novel comprising stories by John Green, Maureen Johnson, and Lauren Myracle
 Let It Snow, a 2019 novel by Nancy Thayer
 Let It Snow, a Toot & Puddle children's book by Holly Hobbie

Music
 Let It Snow: A Holiday Collection, a 2013 album by Jewel
 Let It Snow (EP), a 2003 EP by Michael Bublé
 Let It Snow, a 2017 album by 98 Degrees
 Let It Snow, a 2007 album by Chanticleer
 Let It Snow, a 2004 album by Voices in Public
 "Let It Snow" (song), a 1993 song by Boyz II Men
 Let It Snow, Baby... Let It Reindeer, a 2007 album by Relient K

Television episodes
 "Let It Snow" (ER)
 "Let It Snow" (Night Court)
 "Let It Snow" (Southland)

See also